Stubentor is a station on  of the Vienna U-Bahn. It was inaugurated in 1991 and is located in the Innere Stadt District. The station was named after the city gate located in the area up until 1858. Some relics of this gate, such as the remains of the old structures of the city walls, can be seen in the metro station. Stubentor is a three-story station, two tubes of Line U3 lined up on separate levels.

References

External links 
 

Buildings and structures in Innere Stadt
Railway stations opened in 1991
Vienna U-Bahn stations
1991 establishments in Austria
Railway stations in Austria opened in the 20th century